Daniyar Ismayilov (born 3 February 1992) is a Turkmen weightlifter currently competing for Turkey. He competed for Turkmenistan at the 2012 Summer Olympics. He competed for Turkey at 2016 Olympics and won a silver medal (total 351 kg.) In 2021, his doping test came back positive for the second time.

References

External links
 

Turkmenistan male weightlifters
Ethnic Turkmen people
Weightlifters at the 2012 Summer Olympics
Weightlifters at the 2016 Summer Olympics
Olympic weightlifters of Turkmenistan
Olympic weightlifters of Turkey
Turkish male weightlifters
Turkish people of Turkmenistan descent
1992 births
World Weightlifting Championships medalists
Living people
People from Lebap Region
European champions for Turkey
Olympic silver medalists for Turkey
Medalists at the 2016 Summer Olympics
Olympic medalists in weightlifting
Mediterranean Games gold medalists for Turkey
Mediterranean Games medalists in weightlifting
Competitors at the 2018 Mediterranean Games
European Weightlifting Championships medalists